Ron Blaauw was a restaurant located in Amsterdam in the Netherlands. It is a fine dining restaurant that was awarded one Michelin star in 2004 and 2005 and two Michelin stars in the period 2006–2013. GaultMillau awarded the restaurant 16.0 out of 20 points. 

Ron Blaauw was a member of Alliance Gastronomique Néerlandaise, but left in 2011 due to lack of time

The restaurant was originally located in Ouderkerk aan de Amstel. In 2011, it moved to Amsterdam.

On 27 March 2013, Ron Blaauw announced that he would close his eponymous restaurant on 30 March and open RON Gastrobar on the same location on 4 April.

See also
List of Michelin starred restaurants in the Netherlands

Sources and references 

Restaurants in Amsterdam
Michelin Guide starred restaurants in the Netherlands
Defunct restaurants in the Netherlands